Ixodia achillaeoides, commonly known as mountain daisy, is a species of flowering plant in the family Asteraceae and is found in South Australia and Victoria. It is a small shrub with sticky, smooth branchlets and small white flowers in spring and summer.

Description
The inflorescence is an urn-shaped to oval-shaped cluster of 3-80 white flowers with yellow centres at the end of stems. Flowering mostly occurs in spring and summer.

Taxonomy and naming
Ixodia achillaeoides was first formally described in 1812 by Robert Brown and the description was published in Hortus Kewensis. The specific epithet (achilleoides) refers to the similarity  of the inflorescence to those of plants in the genus Achillea.

Distribution and habitat
This species has a scattered distribution in Victoria. A widespread species in South Australia, occurring in woodland, scrubland and forest.

References

Gnaphalieae
Flora of Victoria (Australia)
Plants described in 1812
Taxa named by Robert Brown (botanist, born 1773)